Bahram Beyg or Bahram Bayg may refer to:

Bahram Bayg, Kermanshah
Bahram Beyg, Lorestan
Bahram Beyg, Zanjan